A Christmas Celebration of Hope is the thirty ninth studio album by American blues guitarist and singer-songwriter B.B. King released in November 2001 through MCA Records. It is a holiday album.

In the United States, A Christmas Celebration of Hope reached peak positions of number 151 on the Billboard 200, number one on Billboard Top Blues Albums chart and number 21 on the Top Holiday Albums chart. The album earned King two Grammy Awards at the 45th Grammy Awards (2003): he, Anthony Daigle and John Holbrook were presented the award for Best Traditional Blues Album and the track "Auld Lang Syne" earned King the award for Best Pop Instrumental Performance.

Composition
A Christmas Celebration of Hope contains 13 tracks totaling approximately 48 minutes in length. Produced by B.B. King himself and recorded in Lafayette, Louisiana at Dockside Recording Studios in June 2001. Some of the songs, including "Merry Christmas, Baby" have roots in blues or rhythm and blues. Nashville String Machine contribute strings to three tracks. King had originally recorded "Christmas Celebration" in 1960. The instrumental "Christmas Love" marks King's only original track on the album (credited as Riley King). The album's closing track, an instrumental version of "Auld Lang Syne", was described by Richie Unterberger as "funky".

Reception

In his review for Allmusic, Richie Unterberger awarded the album 2.5 out of 5 stars and called the collection an "adequate, good-humored reprisal". Unterberger thought only "Please Come Home for Christmas" was overproduced and concluded his review with the statement: "It's hardly the first King you'll pull off your shelf, and not the first R&B Christmas album you'll turn to either, but you could do worse in the holiday season."

A Christmas Celebration of Hope earned King the Grammy Award for Best Traditional Blues Album at the 45th Grammy Awards (2003); awards were also presented to Anthony Daigle and John Holbrook. The track "Auld Lang Syne" earned King the Grammy Award for Best Pop Instrumental Performance.

Track listing

Track listing adapted from Allmusic.

Personnel

 Michael Abene – producer
 Stanley Abernathy – trumpet
 James Bolden – conductor, trumpet
 Robert Burns – composer
 Jay Burton – engineer
 Clarence Carter – composer
 Page Cavanaugh – composer
 Tony Coleman – tambourine
 Rich Costey – assistant
 Anthony Daigle – engineer
 Marcus Daniel – composer
 Mike Doster – bass guitar
 Devin Emk – assistant
 Calep Emphrey – drums
 Kim Gannon – composer
 Lloyd Glenn – composer
 Josiah Gluck – engineer, mixing
 John Holbrook – mixing
 S. "Husky" Höskulds – engineer
 Melvin Jackson – saxophone
 Walter Kent – composer
 B.B. King – arranger, producer
 Walter King – contractor
 Floyd Lieberman – executive producer
 Stephen Marcussen – mastering
 Ken Quartarone – assistant
 Buck Ram – composer
 Jack Smalley – composer
 Jesse Thomas – composer
 James Toney – keyboards
 Vartan – art direction
 Leon Warren – guitar
 Kevin Westenberg – photography

Credits adapted from Allmusic.

Charts
In the United States, A Christmas Celebration of Hope reached peak positions of number 151 on the Billboard 200, number one on Billboard Top Blues Albums chart and number 21 on the Top Holiday Albums chart. The album marked King's fourth to reach the Top Blues Albums chart's number one position. A Christmas Celebration of Hope remained on the Billboard 200 and Top Holiday Albums charts for three weeks; the album remained on the Top Blues Albums chart for ten weeks, including five at the number one position.

References

2001 Christmas albums
B.B. King albums
Christmas albums by American artists
Grammy Award for Best Traditional Blues Album
MCA Records albums